Rožni Dol is a village in the Municipality of Semič in Slovenia. The area is part of the historical region of Lower Carniola. The municipality is now included in the Southeast Slovenia Statistical Region. 

The local church is dedicated to Mary Magdalene and belongs to the Parish of Semič. It was first mentioned in written documents dating to 1526, but was extensively rebuilt in the Baroque style in the mid 18th century.

References

External links
Rožni Dol at Geopedia

Populated places in the Municipality of Semič